All Saints’ Church, Thrumpton is a Grade II* listed parish church in the Church of England in Thrumpton, Nottinghamshire. A stone font in the churchyard is Grade II listed.

It is part of an informal grouping of five churches that are known collectively as "The 453 Churches" as they straddle the A453. The other churches in the group are:
St. Lawrence's Church, Gotham
St. George's Church, Barton in Fabis
St. Winifred's Church, Kingston on Soar
Holy Trinity Church, Ratcliffe-on-Soar

History
The church dates from the 13th century and was restored in 1871 by George Edmund Street.

In 1870 the chancel was rebuilt and the nave restored by architect G E Street.

The tower was repaired and restored in 2004.

Incumbents
As Thrumpton was a chapelry of Ratcliffe until the 16th Century it is probable that it was administered by a curate. A change took place in the 17th century following the fall of the Powdrells and later the Pigotts moved to appoint a preacher. From 1950 Thrumpton ceased to have its own priest the living being shared with Barton and later Gotham.

1553 Robert Smythe
1587 John Fullsborer
1596 Hugh Blunt
1617 Thomas Goodwin
1650 Ferdinando Poole
1667 Philip Ormston
1672 Richard Wilson
1674 William Kayes
1679 Gowin Knight
1684 John Gilbert
1723 John Savage
1748 Thomas Bentley
1777 John Topsham
1787 William Beetham
1798 Thomas Stevenson
1804 John Henry Browne
1811 William Cantrell
1856 Richard Hall
1857 John Cartwright Jones
1863 Philip Henry Douglas
1914 Frederick Byron, 10th Baron Byron
1942 Reginald Alfred Bidwell
1947 Harold Theophilus Pritchard
1960 Arnold Draper Hill
1965 Stephen Timothy Forbes Adam
1970 Robin Philip Protheroe
1973 Andrew Norman Woodsford
1981 Alistair Sutherland
1996 Richard Spray
2001 Steve Osman
2011 Richard Coleman

External links
 Southwell & Nottingham church history project
Church page on the Thrumpton Village Web Site

References

Thrumptonl
Grade II* listed churches in Nottinghamshire